Only One Moon is the fourth studio album by Canadian country music group Prairie Oyster. It was released in Canada by Arista Records on April 8, 1994, and in the United States by Zoo Entertainment on October 10, 1995. The album peaked at number 2 on the RPM Country Albums chart. The band produced the album with Steve Fishell, except for "Did You Fall in Love with Me", which Josh Leo and Richard Bennett produced.

Track listing
"Ancient History" (Bob DiPiero, John Scott Sherrill) – 2:43
"Louisiette" (Keith Glass) – 3:20
"Such a Lonely One" (Russell deCarle) – 3:29
"She Don't Get the Blues" (Alan Jackson, Jim McBride) – 2:51
"Don't Cry Little Angel" (Glass) – 4:31
"Price to Pay" (Lucinda Williams) – 3:18
"Only One Moon" (Glass) – 3:05
"Your Turn to Cry" (Radney Foster, Glass) – 3:04
"Always Believing" (Dave Romeo, Pam Tillis) – 3:32
"Brand New Hard Time Blues" (Joan Besen) – 3:22
"Black-Eyed Susan" (Besen, Ron Hynes) – 3:30
"All Fall Down" (Glass) – 3:41

On American presses of the album, "Always Believing" is replaced with "Did You Fall in Love with Me" (Richard Bennett, Josh Leo) — 3:19

Personnel
Compiled from liner notes.

Prairie Oyster
John P. Allen — fiddle, mandolin, acoustic guitar, background vocals
Joan Besen — piano, organ, background vocals
Russell deCarle — bass guitar, lead vocals
Dennis Delorme — pedal steel guitar
Keith Glass — electric guitar, acoustic guitar, electric sitar, background vocals
Bruce Moffet — drums, percussion

Additional musicians
Richard Bennett — acoustic guitar
Dan Dugmore — acoustic guitar
Bill Hullett — acoustic guitar
Roy Huskey, Jr. — upright bass on "Your Turn to Cry"
Jo-El Sonnier — accordion on "Price to Pay" and "Lousiette"

Technical
Chuck Ainlay — mixing
Richard Bennett — producer
Steve Fishell — producer
Josh Leo — producer
Justin Niebank — mixing
Mike Poole — recording, mixing
Prairie Oyster — producer

Chart performance

References

1994 albums
Prairie Oyster albums
Arista Records albums
Zoo Entertainment (record label) albums